Lescudjack Hill fort is the name given to the unexcavated Iron Age settlement located in Penzance, Cornwall. The site has been damaged and contains allotments and an open area of land which has recently been cleared of thick undergrowth. It is reported that a small lead-copper mine was situated "just outside" the ramparts, however all trace of this appears to have vanished.

In 2004 this land was purchased by Penwith District Council and Penzance Town Council for £45,000 following a series of campaigns in the local community including a campaign conducted by the then Lescudjack Infants School (now part of the Pensans Primary School). According to Penwith District Council's website, a full archaeological survey is being conducted by Cornwall County Council's Historic Environment Service . The site is also subject to a management plan jointly agreed by Penzance Town Council and Penwith District Council.

The site traditionally was  referred to as a castle and Castle Road which runs alongside the site was  named after it. There are also several roads nearby named Lescudjack, two schools have used the name and the local Sure Start is called Lescudjack.

The hill fort was formally handed over to public use on the 21st of December 2007 as part of the Montol Festival.

The fort's name might originate from the Cornish words lan (enclosure) and scosek (shielded)- shielded enclosure or, more likely, "nans" (valley) and "cosek" (wooded); but compare: "lesky" (to burn), "cunnys" (fuel) and "ack" (a place where found) for "LESKInnick" terrace which is just below on the west side of the hill; therefore that could mean a "beacon place".

References

Buildings and structures in Penzance
Penwith
History of Cornwall
Military history of Cornwall
Hill forts in Cornwall
Iron Age sites in Cornwall
Former populated places in Cornwall